This is the discography of American rapper Khia.

Albums

Studio albums
TwerkAnomics

Released : December 6, 2018
Label: Thig Misses Entertainment 
Format : Digital download

Mixtapes
 All Hail the Queen (September 13, 2006)
 The Boss Lady (with DJ Scream) (May 11, 2008)
 Street Respect (with DJ Keem Dawg) (2008)

Singles

As lead artist

As a featured artist

Promotional singles
 "Psychic Eyes" (2013) 
 "I'm Hott" (2014)
 "My X" (2014)
 "Lazer Pop" (featuring Kuntilla) (2014)

Album appearances

Music videos

2022
“KWANG WIT IT”
 Rahn Evans

References

 
 
Hip hop discographies
Discographies of American artists